Ashley Hall (born 3 November 1983) is an Australian professional golfer. He played on the Web.com Tour from 2013 to 2015. He was in a playoff in successive events in 2013, the United Leasing Championship and the Utah Championship, but lost on both occasions. At the end of 2016 he lost another playoff in the Emirates Australian Open and was 4th in the Australian PGA Championship two weeks later. His runner-up position in the Australian Open gave him an entry into the 2017 Open Championship. Hall played in the 2012 Open, where he qualified through International Final Qualifying.

Amateur wins
this list may be incomplete
2005 Master of the Amateurs

Professional wins (3)

PGA Tour of Australasia wins (2)

PGA Tour of Australasia playoff record (1–2)

Von Nida Tour wins (1)

Playoff record
Web.com Tour playoff record (0–2)

Results in major championships

CUT = missed the halfway cut

Results in World Golf Championships

Team appearances
Amateur
Australian Men's Interstate Teams Matches (representing Victoria): 2005, 2006

References

External links

Australian male golfers
PGA Tour of Australasia golfers
Golfers from Melbourne
Sportsmen from Victoria (Australia)
1983 births
Living people